Helmeted gecko is a common name for several lizards and may refer to:

Diplodactylus galeatus, native to the continent of Australia
Tarentola chazaliae, native to Africa